The 2018 Junior Pan American Artistic Gymnastics Championships was held in Buenos Aires, Argentina, June 13–15, 2018.

Medal summary

Junior medalists

Medal table

References

2018 in gymnastics
Pan American Gymnastics Championships
International gymnastics competitions hosted by Peru